"Home" is the first major label single by Japanese singer Angela Aki. It was released on September 14, 2005, and reached number 38 on the Oricon Charts.

Track listing

Charts

External links
Official Discography 

2005 singles
Angela Aki songs
Japanese-language songs
2005 songs
Songs written by Angela Aki